Finn Schiander (7 May 1889 – 7 June 1967) was a Norwegian sailor who competed in the 1920 Summer Olympics. He was a crew member of the Norwegian boat Lyn, which won the silver medal in the 8 metre class (1919 rating).

References

External links
profile

1889 births
1967 deaths
Norwegian male sailors (sport)
Sailors at the 1920 Summer Olympics – 8 Metre
Olympic sailors of Norway
Olympic silver medalists for Norway
Olympic medalists in sailing
Medalists at the 1920 Summer Olympics